The Ocala Historic District is a U.S. Historic District (designated as such on January 12, 1984) located in Ocala, Florida. It encompasses , and is bounded by Broadway, Southeast 8th Street, Silver Springs Place, Southeast 3rd, 13th, and Watula Avenues. It contains 220 historic buildings.

Development for the original residential properties had started sometime in 1880 and continued to 1930, with the most construction invoked by the Florida boom in 1910. The oldest part of the neighborhood is on the King Street, which then sprawled eastbound. Architectural style reflecting the boom includes bungalows, contrasted to the Queen Anne Revival style on the older streets including the King.

References

External links
 Florida's Office of Cultural and Historical Programs - Marion County

Ocala, Florida
National Register of Historic Places in Marion County, Florida
Historic districts on the National Register of Historic Places in Florida
1984 establishments in Florida